Piano Man is the second studio album by American recording artist Billy Joel, released on November 9, 1973, by Columbia Records. The album emerged from legal difficulties with Joel's former label, Family Productions, and ultimately became his first breakthrough album.

The album was certified gold by the RIAA in 1975, but Joel received only $8000 in royalties (US$ in  dollars).

Legacy edition 
Columbia Records released a two-disc legacy version of Piano Man in November 2011.

This edition included a slightly truncated live 1972 Philadelphia 93.3 WMMR FM radio broadcast of early songs that Joel performed and recorded at the Philadelphia-based Sigma Sound Studios. This radio broadcast was extremely important to the success of Joel's music career because, after the show was recorded, the live recording of "Captain Jack" was played by the station and quickly became "the most requested song in the station's history". Once the popularity of this live recording was known, people working for Columbia Records heard the recording and signed Joel to the label. The radio broadcast included three songs ("Long, Long Time"; "Josephine"; and "Rosalinda") that were never on any of Joel's studio albums.

Track listing

Original release
All songs written by Billy Joel.

2011 Legacy Edition bonus disc 
Disc 2: Live at Sigma Sound Studios, Philadelphia, Pennsylvania, April 15, 1972
"Introduction by Ed Sciaky" – 0:29
"Falling of the Rain" – 2:33
"Intro to Travelin' Prayer" – 0:17
"Travelin' Prayer" – 3:11
"Intro to Billy the Kid" – 0:50
"The Ballad of Billy the Kid" – 5:36
"Intro to She's Got a Way" – 1:03
"She's Got a Way" – 3:08
"Intro to Everybody Loves You Now" – 1:19
"Everybody Loves You Now" – 2:56
"Intro to Nocturne" – 0:59
"Nocturne" – 2:46
"Station ID and Intro to Turn Around" – 1:31
"Turn Around" – 3:26
"Intro to Long, Long Time" – 1:19
"Long, Long Time" – 4:46
"Intro to Captain Jack" – 1:19
"Captain Jack" – 6:56
"Intro to Josephine" – 1:40
"Josephine" – 3:23
"Intro to Rosalinda" – 0:33
"Rosalinda" – 3:03
"Tomorrow Is Today" – 5:11

Personnel 
Adapted from the AllMusic credits.
 Billy Joel – vocals, acoustic and electric pianos, organ, harmonica
 Michael Omartian – accordion, arrangements (tracks 1-4, 6-10)
 Jimmie Haskell – arrangements (track 5)
 Richard Bennett, Larry Carlton, & Dean Parks – guitars
 Eric Weissberg – banjo, pedal steel guitar 
 Fred Heilbrun – banjo
 Wilton Felder & Emory Gordy Jr. – bass guitar
 Ron Tutt – drums (tracks 1–9)
 Rhys Clark – drums (track 10)
 Billy Armstrong – violin
 Laura Creamer, Mark Creamer & Susan Steward – backing vocals

Live at Sigma Sound Studios, April 15, 1972
 Billy Joel – piano, harmonica, vocals
 Al Hertzberg – acoustic and electric guitars
 Larry Russell – bass guitar
 Rhys Clark – drums
 Dennis Wilen – producer

Production
 Michael Stewart – producer
 Ron Malo – engineer
 Ted Jensen – remastering
 Beverly Parker – design
 Bill Imhofe – illustration

Reception

Rolling Stone mused that Piano Man "represents a new seriousness and flexibility" for Joel, comparing it to the stylings of Elton John.  Reviewing the album, Billboard stated that it shows that Joel has a "fine shot at establishing himself as consistent quality AM artist with large scale songs and dynamic performing range.

Charts and certifications

Weekly charts

Year-end charts

Certifications

References 

Billy Joel albums
1973 albums
Columbia Records albums
Albums produced by Michael Stewart (musician)
Albums arranged by Michael Omartian
Albums arranged by Jimmie Haskell